Stigmella hahniella is a moth of the family Nepticulidae. It is found in Germany, Austria, the Czech Republic, Slovakia, Croatia, Hungary and Italy.

The larvae feed on Sorbus torminalis. They mine the leaves of their host plant.

External links
Fauna Europaea

Nepticulidae
Moths described in 1890
Moths of Europe